Cracow or Kraków is a city in Poland.

Cracow may also refer to:
 Free City of Cracow (1815–1846), also known as Republic of Cracow, a city-state
 Crakow (shoe), a style of shoes popular in Europe in the 15th century 
 Cracow, Queensland, a town in the Banana Shire, Australia

People with the surname
 Georg Cracow (1525–1575), German statesman

See also
 Krakow (disambiguation)